Murray McCallum (born 16 March 1996) is a Scotland international rugby union player who plays for Edinburgh Rugby in the United Rugby Championship.

Rugby Union career

Amateur career

He played rugby union at Strathallan School and then for Dunfermline.

He was playing for Heriots at the time of his call up to the Edinburgh squad.

Professional career

He made his professional debut for Edinburgh Rugby in October 2016, as a substitute against Treviso.

When Heriots joined the Super 6, he was drafted to his old club, playing against the Southern Knights on 7 December 2019, and against Stirling County on 21 December 2019

On 15 July 2021 it was announced that McCallum had signed a short term deal with Glasgow Warriors. McCallum stated:

He made his competitive debut for Glasgow in the 24 September 2021 match against Ulster away at Ravenhill Stadium in the United Rugby Championship - earning the Glasgow Warrior No. 333.

It was announced on 25 November 2021 that McCallum had signed a contract with Worcester Warriors which will start on 1 January 2022. The Worcester club went into administration after the 2022-23 season started; and their players were released.

McCallum signed a 10 day contract with Pro D2 side US Montauban.

On 13 January 2023, he re-signed with Edinburgh Rugby.

International career

He played for the Scotland Under 20s in the 2016 Rugby World Cup.

In January 2018 he was called up to the senior Scotland squad for the 2018 Six Nations Championship. He made his full senior debut from the bench, to play against Wales in the Six Nations.

Outside of rugby union

While at University of Aberdeen he studied for a BSc in Geology and Petroleum Geology.

References

External links
 Edinburgh Rugby player bio
 Scotland Rugby player bio

1996 births
Living people
Dunfermline RFC players
Edinburgh Rugby players
Glasgow Warriors players
Heriot's RC players
People educated at Strathallan School
People educated at Woodmill High School
Rugby union players from Kirkcaldy
Scotland international rugby union players
Scottish rugby union players
Rugby union props
Worcester Warriors players